Aka is a given name and surname. It may refer to:

Given name
 Aka Gündüz (1886–1958), Turkish poet, composer and politician
 Aka Høegh (born 1947), Greenlandic painter, graphic artist and sculptor
 Aka Nanitashvili, Georgian fashion designer
 Aka Morchiladze, Georgian writer

Surname
 Brice Aka (born 1983), Ivorian footballer
 Essis Aka (born 1990), Ivorian footballer 
 Jonathan Aka (born 1986), French basketball player
 Margaret Aka (born 1976), soccer player and coach from Papua New Guinea
 Pascal Aka (born 1985), Ivorian film director, actor, music video director and producer
 Véronique Aka (born 1959), Ivorian politician
 Wilfrid Aka (born 1979), French-born Ivorian professional basketball player